Steffi Graf was the defending champion and won the final on a walkover against Jana Novotná.

Seeds
A champion seed is indicated in bold text while text in italics indicates the round in which that seed was eliminated. The top eight seeds received a bye to the second round.

  Steffi Graf (champion)
  Helena Suková (second round)
  Manuela Maleeva (third round)
  Arantxa Sánchez (semifinals)
  Sandra Cecchini (third round)
  Jana Novotná (final)
  Catarina Lindqvist (third round)
  Sylvia Hanika (third round)
  Radka Zrubáková (quarterfinals)
  Bettina Fulco (semifinals)
  Isabel Cueto (first round)
  Isabelle Demongeot (third round)
  Barbara Paulus (quarterfinals)
  Nathalie Tauziat (quarterfinals)
  Manon Bollegraf (first round)
  Eva Pfaff (first round)

Draw

Finals

Top half

Section 1

Section 2

Bottom half

Section 3

Section 4

References
 1989 Citizen Cup Draw

1989 WTA Tour